A three-dimensional graph may refer to 
 A graph (discrete mathematics), embedded into a three-dimensional space
 The graph of a function of two variables, embedded into a three-dimensional space